Garnerin Point is a point on the west coast of Graham Land, Antarctica, projecting into Wilhelmina Bay southeast of Pelseneer Island. It was charted by the Belgian Antarctic Expedition under Gerlache, 1897–99, and was named by the UK Antarctic Place-Names Committee in 1960 for Andre J. Garnerin, a French aeronaut who was the first man to make a successful descent from a free balloon by parachute, in 1797.

References

Headlands of Graham Land
Danco Coast